Kenneth George Peake (24 July 1920 – 26 November 2011) was an English cricketer. Peake was a right-handed batsman who bowled right-arm fast-medium. He was born at Leicester, Leicestershire.

Peake made a single first-class appearance for Leicestershire against Gloucestershire at Grace Road in the 1946 County Championship. Leicestershire won the toss and batted first, with Peake ending their innings of 211 all out unbeaten on 1. He bowled twelve wicketless overs in Gloucestershire's first-innings of 348 all out, conceding 52 runs. In Leicestershire's second-innings of 360 all out, he was dismissed for a single run by Tom Goddard. He did not bowl in Gloucestershire's second-innings, in which they reached their target with four wickets in hand. This was his only major appearance for the county.

He died in Leicester on 26 November 2011 aged 91.

References

External links
Kenneth Peake at ESPNcricinfo
Kenneth Peake at CricketArchive

1920 births
2011 deaths
Cricketers from Leicester
English cricketers
Leicestershire cricketers